Qaleh Barun (also Romanized as Qal‘eh Barūn and Qal‘eh Berūn; also known as Ghal‘eh Baran, Qal’eh Barān, Qal‘eh Barān, and Qal‘eh Berān) is a village in Kushk Rural District, Abezhdan District, Andika County, Khuzestan Province, Iran. At the 2006 census, its population was 323, in 60 families.

References 

Populated places in Andika County